Leskovica is a village in the municipality of Štip, North Macedonia.

Demographics
According to the 2002 census, the village had a total of 113 inhabitants. Ethnic groups in the village include:

Macedonians 111
Serbs 2

References

Villages in Štip Municipality